Marcus Armitage (born 15 July 1987) is an English professional golfer. He won the 2021 Porsche European Open on the European Tour.

Professional career
Armitage earned rookie of the year honours on the 2013 PGA EuroPro Tour. He also won on tour as part of fourteen total victories for the year. Over the 2014 season, Armitage reworked his swing. Armitage won twice on the 2015 PGA EuroPro Tour, finished fourth in the money list, and earned his tour card for the 2016 Challenge Tour.

Armitage won the 2016 Foshan Open on the Challenge Tour. He was also a runner-up in the Volopa Irish Challenge and finished 11th in the Order of Merit to earn his tour card for the 2017 European Tour.

Armitage had a disappointing season in 2017 and lost his card on the main tour. He made a useful start of the 2018 Challenge Tour season with a runner-up finish in the Belt & Road Colorful Yunnan Open. He had two moderate seasons on the Challenge Tour, finishing 50th in the 2018 Order of Merit and 85th in 2019. However he earned a return to the European Tour with a good performance in the European Tour Q School. In January 2020, he recorded his best finish on the European Tour at the time, when he was third in the South African Open.

In June 2021, Armitage claimed his first victory on the European Tour at the Porsche European Open. He shot a final-round 65 to win by two shots.

Professional wins (6)

European Tour wins (1)

*Note: The 2021 Porsche European Open was shortened to 54 holes due to COVID-19 travel restrictions in Germany.

Challenge Tour wins (1)

PGA EuroPro Tour wins (3)

Jamega Pro Golf Tour wins (1)

Results in major championships
Results not in chronological order before 2019 and in 2020.

CUT = missed the half-way cut
"T" = tied
NT = No tournament due to COVID-19 pandemic

See also
2016 Challenge Tour graduates
2019 European Tour Qualifying School graduates

References

External links

English male golfers
European Tour golfers
Sportspeople from Huddersfield
1987 births
Living people